The Fashion Focus was the fourth full-length album released by Starflyer 59. This release marked a significant change in the band's sound.  Where previous albums had focused on loud guitars in the style of shoegazer bands such as My Bloody Valentine and Ride, The Fashion Focus had a softer sound, with keyboards playing a larger role. This album was also the first Starflyer 59 album not to feature a monochromatic cover.

Track listing
(all songs written by Jason Martin)

Credits
 Jason Martin – guitar, keyboards, singing, bass guitar, tambourine
 Jeff Cloud – bass guitar
 Wayne Everett – drum kit, tambourine, backing vocalist, sleigh bells
 Gene Eugene – keyboards, bass guitar
 Mike Knott – backing vocalist on "Shut Your Mouth"
 The Collection Agency – design and photography
 Anthony Saint James – band photography

References

Starflyer 59 albums
1998 albums
Tooth & Nail Records albums